Raguhn-Jeßnitz is a town in the district of Anhalt-Bitterfeld, in Saxony-Anhalt, Germany. It was formed on 1 January 2010 by the merger of the former municipalities Altjeßnitz, Jeßnitz, Marke, Raguhn, Retzau, Schierau, Thurland and Tornau vor der Heide. These 8 former municipalities are now Ortschaften or municipal divisions of the town Raguhn-Jeßnitz.

References

 
Anhalt-Bitterfeld